Jerry Herbert Vandiver is an American songwriter and musician. He has had two top ten singles and 5 charted singles on the Billboard Country charts.  Vandiver's songs have been recorded by Tim McGraw, Gene Watson, Phil Vassar, Lonestar, The Oak Ridge Boys, Lee Greenwood, Barbara Mandrell, Dusty Drake and many others.  Vandiver has RIAA Certified song credits on more than 15 million records.  Two of Vandiver's songs, "It Doesn't Get Any Countrier Than This" and "For a Little While" (both recorded by Tim McGraw) are among the gold and platinum records on display at the Country Music Hall of Fame in Nashville, Tennessee.

Chart Singles Written by Jerry Vandiver

The following is a list of Jerry Vandiver compositions that were chart hits.

Recordings Produced by Jerry Vandiver
2001: "Don't Try This At Home" – Jerry Vandiver
2012: "True and Deep – Songs for the Heart of the Paddler" – Jerry Vandiver
2012: "Interwoven Roots" – Shy-Anne Hovorka
2012: "I Wrote This One For You" – Jerry Vandiver
2014: "Every Scratch Tells A Story" – Jerry Vandiver
2016: "Mixed Dry Bag" – Jerry Vandiver

Books Written by Jerry Vandiver
In the Fall of 2002, Vandiver and co-writer Gracie Hollombe released a self-help text for songwriters entitled "Your First Cut: A Step-by-Step Guide to Getting There"

References

American country songwriters
Musicians from Kansas City, Missouri
1948 births
Living people
People from Nashville, Tennessee
Singer-songwriters from Tennessee
Singer-songwriters from Missouri
American male singer-songwriters